The Auburn 8-Eighty-Eight sedan is an automobile that was manufactured by Auburn of Auburn, Indiana.

Auburn 8-Eighty-Eight Sedan specifications (1926 data) 

 Color – Blue or moleskin two-tone lacquer
 Seating Capacity – Five
 Wheelbase – 129 inches
 Wheels – Wood wheels standard
 Tires – 30” x 5.77” balloon
 Service Brakes – Contracting on rear wheels; expanding on front wheels
 Emergency Brakes – Contracting on propeller shaft
 Engine  – Eight-cylinder, vertical, cast en block, 3-1/8 x 4-1/4 inches; head removable; valves inside; H.P. 31.25, N.A.C.C. rating
 Lubrication – Full force feed – regulated to opening and closing of throttle, not by speed of motor
 Crankshaft – Five bearing
 Radiator – Cellular
 Cooling – Water pump
 Ignition – Storage battery
 Starting System – Two Unit
 Voltage – Six 
 Wiring System – Single
 Gasoline System – Vacuum
 Clutch – Long clutch
 Transmission – Selective sliding
 Gear Changes – 3 forward, 1 reverse
 Drive – Spiral bevel
 Rear Springs – Semi-elliptic
 Rear Axle – Semi-floating
 Steering Gear – Cam and lever; variable ratio

Standard equipment
New car price included the following items:
 tools
 jack
 speedometer
 ammeter
 electric horn
 demountable rims
 cowl ventilator
 headlight dimmer
 closed cars have heater and dome light

Optional equipment
The following was available at an extra cost:
 Spoke wheels

Prices
New car prices were available F.O.B. factory plus tax on the following models:
 Five Passenger Sedan - $1795
 Five Passenger Four Door Brougham - $1595
 Six Passenger Roadster - $1495

See also
 Auburn Automobile

References
Source: 

Cars of the United States
1920s cars
Sedans